During the 1979–80 English football season, Leicester City F.C. competed in the Football League Second Division.

Season summary
In the 1979–80 season, Leicester were promoted as champions of the Second Division for the sixth time in the club's history. From start of the season, the Foxes scored in every game until their 2-0 defeat at Charlton Athletic in mid-December. The only negative part of Leicester's season was a shock FA Cup exit against non-league Harlow Town. It was the first time the Foxes lost to a non-league team in a cup competition since the 1914-15 season. Despite that, after a 2-1 win at Filbert Street against Charlton, Leicester were all but assured of promotion and on the final day of the season, the Foxes beat Leyton Orient at Brisbane Road and with Sunderland only picking up a point, Leicester were crowned champions.

Final league table

Results summary

Results by round

Results
Leicester City's score comes first

Legend

Football League Second Division

FA Cup

League Cup

Squad

References

Leicester City F.C. seasons
Leicester City